Littleton Holland (1770-1847) was an American silversmith, active in Baltimore, Maryland.

Holland first appears in the 1802 Baltimore Directory as a jeweler located at 122 Baltimore Street, with Peter Little (1775-1830), a clock- and watchmaker, listed at the same address from 1799-1814. Holland was listed in the city directories on Baltimore Street until 1822. By 1833 he had relocated to 13 St. Paul's Street and seems to have conducted business there until his death in 1847. His works are collected in the Baltimore Museum of Art, Honolulu Museum of Art, Museum of Early Southern Decorative Arts, and Yale University Art Gallery.

References 
 "Sugar Basket by Littleton Holland", Museum of Early Southern Decorative Arts.
 Silver in Maryland: Catalogue and Exhibition, Jennifer Faulds Goldsborough, Museum and Library of Maryland History, Maryland Historical Society, 1983, page 43.
 American Silversmiths and Their Marks, Volume 3, Stephen Guernsey Cook Ensko, 1927, pages 73, 186.
 Kovels' American Silver Marks, Ralph M. Kovel, Crown Publishers, 1989, page 185.
 The Baltimore Directory and Register, for 1814-15 ..., James Lakin, J.C. O'Reilly, 1814, page 106.
 "Littleton Holland", Sterling Flatware Fashions.
 "A 12 1/2 inch ladle by Littleton Holland, Baltimore", Old South Silver.
 Three Centuries of Historic Silver: Loan Exhibitions Under the Auspices of the Pennsylvania Society of the Colonial Dames of America, Mrs. Alfred Coxe Prime, Society, 1938, page 12.

American silversmiths
1770 births
1847 deaths